Adam Kemp (born December 20, 1990) is an American professional basketball player for Rawlplug Sokół Łańcut of the Polish Basketball League (PLK). In 2014, Kemp graduated from Marist College with a degree in Sports Communication, and a minor in Psychology.

He joined the Detroit Pistons for the 2015 Orlando Summer League.

Professional career
On June 12, 2016, Kemp signed with Spirou Charleroi of the Belgian Basketball League.

On August 7, 2017, Kemp signed with BC Beroe of the Bulgarian NBL.

On September 7, 2018, Kemp signed with SKS Starogard Gdański of the Polish Basketball League (PLK).

On June 18, 2019, Kemp signed with Astoria Bydgoszcz of the Polish Basketball League (PLK). He averaged 10.6 points, 7.1 rebounds and 1.6 blocks per game. On August 20, 2020, Kemp signed with Start Lublin.

On June 5, 2021, he has signed with Legia Warszawa of the Polish Basketball League.

On November 11, 2022, he signed with Rawlplug Sokół Łańcut of the Polish Basketball League (PLK).

References

External links
 
 Profile at Eurobasket.com 
 Profile at RealGM.com

1990 births
Living people
American Episcopalians
American expatriate basketball people in Belgium
American expatriate basketball people in Bulgaria
American expatriate basketball people in Greece
American expatriate basketball people in Kazakhstan
American expatriate basketball people in North Macedonia
American expatriate basketball people in Poland
American men's basketball players
Astoria Bydgoszcz players
Basketball players from New York (state)
BC Astana players
BC Beroe players
Koroivos B.C. players
Legia Warsaw (basketball) players
Marist College people
Marist Red Foxes men's basketball players
People from Oneida County, New York
People with Tourette syndrome
Power forwards (basketball)
Spirou Charleroi players
Start Lublin players
The Winchendon School alumni